7Senses (in Chinese: 国际小分队, often stylized as Sen7es, 7SENSES or SEN7ES) is a sub-unit of the Chinese girl group SNH48 and its first global unit.

7Senses debuted on the 24th ERC Chinese Top Ten Awards on March 27, 2017 in Shanghai, China with the song “Girl Crush” and their debut showcase on April 7, 2017 at the Mixing Room, Shanghai. 7Senses is currently made up of 5 members: Zhao Yue (Akira), Dai Meng (Diamond), Xu-Yang Yuzhuo (Eliwa), Xu Jiaqi (Kiki), Chen Lin (Lynn), with two former members Kong Xiaoyin (Bee) and Zhang Yuge (Tako). They were trained by an international team of professionals, including special training in South Korea along with other K-pop trainees, absorbing and learning from the Korean idol system. The number 7 stands for perfection, luck and infinite possibilities on stage.

After their debut in 2017, 7Senses gained popularity outside of mainland China. They started their first reality show/documentary titled "Lucky Seven Baby" on May 2, 2017. The second season released on December 18, 2017. Season three was released on December 20, 2018 and the fourth season was released on November 8, 2019.

Members

Current members

Former members

Discography

EPs

Singles

Videography

Awards and nominations

References

External links
 7SENSES official website
 SNH48 official website
 7SENSES official Weibo

Chinese girl groups
SNH48
2017 establishments in China
Japanese-language singers
Korean-language singers of China
Musical groups established in 2017
Musical groups from Shanghai